Here is a list of Georgian television series by years.

References 
 Famous Georgian TV series returns after a 10-year hiatus
  Georgian actor to appear in American TV series
  When will TV series Ideal Mother be back on First Channel’s air?
  New Georgian TV series Ideal Mother to begin on First Channel today
  Based on YouTube statistics First Channel leads in Georgian media
  New Georgian TV series Ideal Mother to begin on March 4
 Hot Dog (Georgian Criminal Drama TV Series) Opening

Television in Georgia (country)
Georgian-language mass media
Georgian
Television shows in Georgia (country)